Taha is a community in Tamale Metropolitan District in the Northern Region of Ghana.

See also
Suburbs of Tamale (Ghana) metropolis

References 

Communities in Ghana
Suburbs of Tamale, Ghana